Kortesjärvi is a former municipality of Finland. It was consolidated, together with Alahärmä and Ylihärmä, to Kauhava on 1 January 2009.

It is located in the province of Western Finland and is part of the Southern Ostrobothnia region.

The municipality was unilingually Finnish.

References

External links 

Populated places disestablished in 2009
2009 disestablishments in Finland
Former municipalities of Finland
Kauhava